Ampella (minor planet designation: 198 Ampella) is a Main belt asteroid that was discovered by Alphonse Borrelly on June 13, 1879. The name seems to be the feminine form of Ampelos, a satyr and good friend of Dionysus in Greek mythology. It could also derive from the Ampelose (plural of Ampelos), a variety of hamadryad. It is an S-type asteroid.

So far Ampella has been observed occulting a star once, on November 8, 1991, from New South Wales, Australia.

This asteroid has been resolved by the W. M. Keck Observatory, resulting in a size estimate of 53 km. It is oblate in shape, with a size ratio of 1.22 between the major and minor axes. Measurements from the IRAS observatory gave a similar size estimate of 57 km. Photometric measurements made in 1993 give a rotation period of 10.38 hours.

References

External links 
 Lightcurve plot of 198 Ampella, Palmer Divide Observatory, B. D. Warner (2009)
 Asteroid Lightcurve Database (LCDB), query form (info )
 Dictionary of Minor Planet Names, Google books
 Asteroids and comets rotation curves, CdR – Observatoire de Genève, Raoul Behrend
 Discovery Circumstances: Numbered Minor Planets (1)-(5000) – Minor Planet Center
 
 

Background asteroids
Ampella
Ampella
S-type asteroids (Tholen)
S-type asteroids (SMASS)
18790613